This is a list of coalition (Multi-National Force – Iraq) military operations of the Iraq War.  The list covers operations from 2003 until December 2011.  For later operations, see American-led intervention in Iraq (2014–present).

2003

Though the initial war lasted for only 21 days, the coalition soon found themselves fighting insurgent forces.  Upon completion of the initial conflict the coalition troops began counterinsurgency, humanitarian, security and various other types of operations in order to stabilize the country.

2004

During the early occupation, a number of widely cited humanitarian, tactical, and political errors by coalition planners, particularly the United States and United Kingdom led to a growing armed resistance, usually called the "Iraqi insurgency" (referred to by the mainstream media and coalition governments). The anti-occupation/anti-coalition forces are believed to be predominantly, but not exclusively, Iraqi Sunni Muslim Arabs, plus some foreign Arab and Muslim fighters, some of the latter tied to al-Qaeda. Several minor coalition members have pulled out of Iraq; this has been widely considered a political success for the anti-occupation forces.

Despite this, there was a reduction in violence throughout Iraq in the start of 2004 due to reorganization within the insurgent forces. During this time the tactics used by coalition forces were studied and the insurgency began to plan a new strategy. The calm did not last long however and once the insurgency had regained its footing attacks resumed and increased. Throughout the remainder of 2004 and continuing into the present day, the insurgency has employed bombings as their primary means of combating the coalition forces. This has led to hundreds of Iraqi civilians and police killed in addition to the coalition forces they were fighting. Many were killed in a series of massive bombings at mosques and shrines throughout Iraq. The bombings indicated that as the relevance of Saddam Hussein and his followers was diminishing, radical Islamists, both foreign and Iraqi was increasing to take their place. An organized Sunni insurgency, with deep roots and both nationalist and Islamist motivations, was becoming clear. The Mahdi Army also began launching attacks on coalition targets and to seize control from the Iraqi security forces. The southern and central portions of Iraq began to erupt in urban guerilla combat as coalition forces attempted to keep control and prepared for a counteroffensive.

In response to insurgent attacks, coalition forces focused on hunting down the remaining leaders of the former regime, culminating in the shooting deaths of Saddam's two sons in July. In all, over 200 top leaders of the former regime were killed or captured, as well as supports and military personnel during the summer of 2004.

2005

Coalition and Iraqi government forces continue to battle Iraqi militants and other fighters. During early and mid-May 2005, the U.S. also launched Operation Matador, an assault by around 1,000 Marines in the ungoverned region of western Iraq. Coalition and Iraqi soldiers, Iraqi fighters and civilians have been killed in these conflicts. As of late July 2007, nearly 3,700 U.S. soldiers have been killed, and around ten times this many have been wounded. The number of Iraqi citizens who have fallen victim to the fighting has risen. The Iraqi government, with some holdovers from the CPA, engaged in securing control of the oil infrastructure (a source of Iraq's foreign currency) and control of the major cities of Iraq. The insurgency, the developing the New Iraqi Army, disorganized police and security forces, as well as a lack of revenue have hampered efforts to assert control. In addition, former Baathist elements and militant Shia groups have engaged in sabotage, terrorism, open rebellion, and establishing their own security zones in all or part of a dozen cities. The Allawi government vowed to crush the insurgency.

An election for a government to draft a permanent constitution took place during this time (ed. see Politics of Iraq for more information on the political state of Iraq). Although some violence and lack of widespread Sunni participation marred the event, much of the eligible Kurd and Shia populace participated. Sectarian violence has also been prominent part of the militant and guerrilla activity. Targets here where often Shia gatherings or civilian concentrations mainly of Shias. As a result, over 700 Iraqi civilians died in the month.

2006

The beginning of 2006 was marked by government creation talks, growing sectarian violence, and continuous anti-coalition attacks. Sectarian violence expanded to a new level of intensity following the al-Askari Mosque bombing in the Iraqi city of Samarra, on 22 February 2006. The explosion at the mosque, one of the holiest sites in Shi'a Islam, is believed to have been caused by a bomb planted by Al-Qaeda in Iraq. Although no injuries occurred in the blast, the mosque was severely damaged and the bombing resulted in violence over the following days.

As of 20 October the U.S military announced that Operation Together Forward had failed to stem the tide of violence in Baghdad, and Shiite militants under al-Sadr seized several southern Iraq cities.

On 23 November, the deadliest attack since the beginning of the Iraq war occurred. Suspected Sunni-Arab militants used five suicide car bombs and two mortar rounds on the capital's Shiite Sadr City slum to kill at least 215 people and wound 257. Shiite mortar teams quickly retaliated, firing 10 shells at Sunni Islam's most important shrine in Baghdad, badly damaging the Abu Hanifa mosque and killing one person. Eight more rounds slammed down near the offices of the Association of Muslim Scholars, the top Sunni Muslim organisation in Iraq, setting nearby houses on fire. Two other mortar barrages on Sunni neighborhoods in west Baghdad killed nine and wounded 21, police said.

After capture in December 2003, Saddam Hussein was hanged on 30 December 2006 after being found guilty of crimes against humanity by an Iraqi court.

2007

2007 saw a rise in humanitarian and peacekeeping operations as well as a large "surge" in US forces designed to help stabilize the region.

On 10 January 2007, President Bush announced changes in the administration's political and military strategy in the Iraq War during a television speech broadcast. The speech and underlying strategy had been crafted under the working title "The New Way Forward." In the address Bush stated "America will change our strategy to help the Iraqis carry out their campaign to put down sectarian violence and bring security to the people of Baghdad. This will require increasing American force levels. So I've committed more than 20,000 additional American troops to Iraq. The vast majority of them—five brigades—will be deployed to Baghdad."

As part of this new strategy, 2007 saw several major military operations aimed at eliminating insurgent activities, increase support services such as medical facilities and utilities and the training of Iraqi citizens as police or military personnel.

The largest of these new operations were Operations Law and Order, Phantom Thunder and Phantom Strike.

2008

2009

2010

2011

See also

Casualties of the Iraq War
Civil war in Iraq (2006–07)

Iraqi insurgency
United States casualties of war

References

Sources

Iraqi sources
Iraq Diaries – Iraqis writing about their experiences of war.
The Ground Truth Project – A series of exclusive, in-depth interviews with Iraqis, aid workers, military personnel and others who have spent significant time on-the-ground in Iraq.
What Iraqis Think – A compilation of the latest polls and blogs coming out of Iraq.
Casualties
(additional links not found in Casualties links section)
"Iraqi Civilian Deaths Increase Dramatically After Invasion" Johns Hopkins School of Public Health, 28 October 2004.
"One-Day Toll in Iraq Combat Is Highest for U.S. in Months", Washington Post, 19 October 2006.
U.S. Military Personnel Wounded in Iraq & Afghanistan: A Running Log.
Moving a Nation to Care: Post-Traumatic Stress Disorder and America's Returning Troops by Ilona Meagher, Introduction by Penny Coleman, Foreword by Robert Roerich, M.D.

 Combat operations related
"Aerial Propaganda Leaflet Database". Psywar.org, 6 November 2005. (ed. Iraq War PSYOP leaflets and posters)

News
Electronic Iraq: Daily news and analysis from Iraq with a special focus on the Iraqi experience of war.
News from Iraq: Aggregated news on the war, including politics and economics.
The Struggle for Iraq: BBC Best Link: All the latest news, analysis and images from Iraq.

External links

High resolution maps of Iraq.
National Force Iraq Website
Global security
Multi National Corps-Iraq
Defense America
US Army 1st Division website
DVIDS Website
United States Army Website

List Of Coalition Military Operations of the 2nd Iraq War
Military operations of the Iraq War involving the United States
Military operations of the Iraq War involving Iraq
Iraq War coalition military operations
Coalition military operations
Operat